Dijkhuizen is a Dutch toponymic surname meaning "houses on the dike". Among variant forms are Dijkhuijsen, Dijkhuis (singular) and Dykhuizen. People with this name include:

 (1821–1897), Dutch organist and composer (published as D.H. Dijkhuyzen)
Henk Dijkhuizen (born 1992), Dutch football defender
Marinus Dijkhuizen (born 1972), Dutch football forward and manager
Stefanie Dijkhuizen (born 1983), Dutch football midfielder
Dijkhuis / Dykhuis
Jenske Dijkhuis (born 1980), Dutch designer
Karl Dykhuis (born 1972), Canadian ice hockey defenceman
Reinder Dijkhuis (born 1971), Dutch comics artist

References

Dutch-language surnames
Dutch toponymic surnames